Muhammad Afif Asyraf bin Mohamad Zabawi (born 7 June 1991) is a Malaysian professional footballer who plays for Malaysia Super League club Perak as a defender.

References

External links
 

1991 births
Living people
Malaysian footballers
UiTM FC players
Perak F.C. players
Malaysia Super League players
Malaysia Premier League players
Association football defenders
People from Selangor